Anil Sarkar (died 11 February 2015) was an Indian politician and member of the Communist Party of India (Marxist). He was a nine-term member of the Tripura Legislative Assembly representing the Pratapgarh assembly constituency.

Political career
Sarkar completed his post-graduation in Bengali language from the Calcutta University, West Bengal. In 1956 he joined the Communist Party of India and later in 1964, when the Communist Party of India (Marxist) was established, he joined the CPI(M).

A staunch Communist, Sarkar was first elected to the Tripura Legislative Assembly from the Teliamura (Vidhan Sabha constituency) in 1972 on a Communist Party of India (Marxist) ticket and defeated his opponent Bir Chandra Barman by about 1600 votes. In the next assembly election of 1977 Sarkar changed his constituency to the Pratapgarh (Vidhan Sabha constituency) and won against the Indian National Congress candidate Madhusudan Das by about 7500 votes.

In the next election of 1983 Sarkar again defeated Madhusudan Das from the Indian national congress by about 5000 votes.  In the 1988 assembly election, Sarkar  took on the Indian National Congress' Madhusudan Das, whom he had defeated in the 1977 and 1983 election. The result was the same and Sarkar won by a margin of about 2500 votes. This win sent him for the fourth time to Tripura's lower house. By the time the 1993 assembly election took place, Sarkar was already a four-term MLA and defeated congress's Madhusudan Das by about 7000 votes.

In the 1998, 2003, and 2008 Tripura assembly election, Sarkar held the seat defeating  Narayan Das and Bimal Chandra Barman of the Indian National Congress.  The 2013 election was his last; he defeated Ranjit Kumar Das of the Indian National Congress by a margin of about 2000 votes.

Personal life
Sarkar was an acclaimed poet, writer, and intellectual. He authored 24 books and received numerous literary awards. In 1971, he was credited with helping provide relief and shelter in Tripura to hundreds of thousands of refugees fleeing from the Bangladesh Liberation War. He and his wife had a son.

Sarkar died on 11 February 2015 after a long illness.

References 

2015 deaths
Tripura politicians
Communist Party of India (Marxist) politicians from Tripura
Tripura MLAs 1972–1977
Tripura MLAs 1977–1983
Tripura MLAs 1983–1988
Tripura MLAs 1988–1993
Tripura MLAs 1993–1998
Tripura MLAs 1998–2003
Tripura MLAs 2003–2008
Tripura MLAs 2008–2013
Tripura MLAs 2013–2018